Chironomia is the art of using gesticulations or hand gestures to good effect in traditional rhetoric or oratory.   Effective use of the hands, with or without the use of the voice, is a practice of great antiquity, which was developed and systematized by the Greeks and the Romans.  Various gestures had conventionalized meanings which were commonly understood, either within certain class or professional groups, or broadly among dramatic and oratorical audiences.

Gilbert Austin was a well-known author on chironomia. The article about him contains a summary of theories in chironomia.

See also 

 Gesticulation in Italian 
 Mudra

References
 John Bulwer, Chirologia ; Or the Natural Language of the Hand. Chironomia or the Art of Manual Rhetoric (1644). (Landmarks in rhetoric and public address).
 Gilbert Austin, Chironomia, or a Treatise on Rhetorical Delivery (1806). Ed. Mary Margaret Robb and Lester Thonssen. Carbondale, IL: Southern Illinois UP, 1966.

Rhetoric
Gestures